Bridgeport is an unincorporated community in Baker County, Oregon, United States.  It has a post office with the ZIP code 97819.  Bridgeport is south of Baker City and just east of Oregon Route 245. The Burnt River flows by Bridgeport.

References

Unincorporated communities in Baker County, Oregon
Unincorporated communities in Oregon